Jessica Lee Goldyn (born December 26, 1985) is an American Broadway actress who performed in the revival of A Chorus Line as Val. She played the lead role of Cassie from August 10, 2008 opposite Mario Lopez who played the character Zack, until the show ended its Broadway revival run on August 17, 2008. Goldyn had been an understudy for the lead character of Cassie.
She played Annie in Annie the Musical at age 21.
Goldyn appeared in The Paper Mill Playhouse (NJ) rendition of "Chorus Line" in the star role of Cassie from October 7 through October 28, 2012.

Early Training
Goldyn grew up in Parsippany-Troy Hills, New Jersey where she spent her early years dancing. Her mother taught her dance until she was old enough to attend dance class. Additionally, she did gymnastics competitively, starting around age 7.

At 12, she was cast in a production of Gypsy at the Paper Mill Playhouse. During her teen years she played nearly every female character in a Chorus Line, including a female version of Mike.

She attended the Professional Performing Arts School in New York but never graduated. Instead she received her GED after getting hired in a non-Equity tour of Fosse.

Goldyn has trained with the New Jersey Ballet Company and has been a student and instructor at the Worth Tyrrell Studios.

Goldyn was a Children's Foundation for the Arts grant recipient from 1998 to 2003.

Personal life 
On Instagram, Goldyn has posted openly about her sobriety. She has been sober since 2013.

Previous Work
Goldyn's professional debut was in the ensemble of Gypsy at the Paper Mill Playhouse in September 1998.

Goldyn has been credited in various roles over the years.  Some of them include: Fosse, regional production of A Chorus Line also as Val, Sweet Charity as Charity, Ensemble of A Christmas Carol at North Shore Music Theatre, and Ensemble of Pippin at the Arvada Center.  Goldyn has previously played the Chorus Line character Cassie before, as well as Val in addition to roles in Sweet Charity and Pippin.

Broadway
Goldyn made her Broadway debut on October 5, 2006 when she opened as Val in the revival of A Chorus Line.  Goldyn is one of the few original cast members who closed the show, by then as Cassie. At the auditions for the revival, Goldyn was originally considered as a cover for the character Val, but won the role at the final callback. Goldyn replaced Charlotte d'Amboise as Cassie from Aug 13, 2008 - Aug 17, 2008.

In 2015, Goldyn returned to Broadway in Finding Neverland at the Lunt-Fontanne Theatre.  Goldyn was previously featured in the short-lived Broadway production of Tuck Everlasting, which opened April 26, 2016 at the Broadhurst Theatre.. Unfortunately, the show only ran a total of 28 Previews and 39 regular performances and closed on May 29, 2016.

Since 2017, Goldyn has performed in the ensemble of the Bette Midler-led revival of Hello, Dolly! at the Shubert Theatre (New York City).

Other Stage Work

On the Town
Goldyn portrayed Ivy in On the Town as part of New York City Center's 2008-2009 Encores! season.  Part of a citywide celebration this season of Leonard Bernstein's 90th birthday who wrote the original score for On the Town.  Goldyn  starred opposite Justin Bohon as Chip, Christian Borle as Ozzie and Tony Yazbeck as Gabey.  The other female romantic counterparts of the three sailors on shore leave in the Big Apple were Leslie Kritzer as Hildy Esterhazy and Jennifer Laura Thompson as Claire DeLoone.  On the Town first opened in 1944 at the Adelphi Theatre.

Crazy for You
Goldyn portrayed "Polly" in the Maine State Music Theatre production of Crazy for You in July 2009 alongside Tony Yazbeck from her Chorus Line days.

Sweet Charity
From July 30, 2009 to August 9; Goldyn choreographed Sweet Charity at The Mac-Haydn Theatre in Chatham, N.Y. Using original Fosse choreography.

Peter Pan
2010; Goldyn was returned to Paper Mill Playhouse as "Tiger Lilly" in their production of Peter Pan. This ran from June 2 till June 27.

Damn Yankees
In August 2010 Jessica replaced Felicia Finley as Lola in Damn Yankees at the John W. Engeman Theater in Northport.

Chicago 
As of 2019, Goldlyn is playing Roxie Hart in Fulton Theatre's production of Chicago. Alongside her is fellow Chorus Line cast member Heather Parcells, as Velma. Its set to open in January 2019, and close mid-February.

References

External sources

A Chorus Line: Now Playing On Broadway; The Cast: Jessica Lee Goldyn (Val)
Playbill: Jessica Lee Goldyn
Broadway.Com: On The Line: Meeting The Stars Of A Chorus Line
CBS Evening News: Jersey Girl Is A Singular Sensation
MASTER CLASS with Jessica Lee Goldyn
Rocky Mountain News - Broadway bound: Arvada Center actress wins a key role in 'Chorus Line'
NJTheater.com
The New Yorker - Toeing The Line: "A Chorus Line" is back on Broadway
NJ.COM - A Chorus Line: Ready to tread the boards

1985 births
Living people
People from Parsippany-Troy Hills, New Jersey
American stage actresses
American musical theatre actresses
21st-century American women